|}

The Prix du Moulin de Longchamp is a Group 1 flat horse race in France open to horses aged three years or older. It is run at Longchamp over a distance of 1,600 metres (about 1 mile), and it is scheduled to take place each year in September.

History
The event is named after the Moulin de Longchamp, a windmill located within the grounds of the racecourse. The mill was originally part of an abbey, and its foundation stone was laid by Saint Louis in 1256. It was destroyed during the French Revolution, but reconstructed when the racecourse was built in 1856.

The Prix du Moulin de Longchamp was one of two major races introduced to celebrate Longchamp's centenary in 1957. Both initially took place on the first Sunday in October, the same day as the Prix de l'Arc de Triomphe. The other race, the Prix de l'Abbaye de Longchamp, is still held at that meeting.

The Prix du Moulin was moved to late September in 1974, and to the first Sunday of that month in 1980. It was formerly contested on Longchamp's middle course (the moyenne piste), but was switched to the main course (the grande piste) in 1987. The race was rescheduled for mid-September in 2011.

The race was opened to geldings from the 2020 running.

Records
Most successful horse:
 no horse has won this race more than once

Leading jockey (6 wins):
 Cash Asmussen – Mendez (1984), Soviet Star (1988), Polish Precedent (1989), Kingmambo (1993), Spinning World (1997), Indian Lodge (2000)

Leading trainer (7 wins):
 André Fabre – Soviet Star (1988), Polish Precedent (1989), Ski Paradise (1994), Nebraska Tornado (2003), Grey Lilas (2004), Vadamos (2016), Persian King (2020)

Leading owner (4 wins):
 HH Aga Khan IV – Silver Shark (1966), Ashkalani (1996), Sendawar (1999), Ervedya (2015)

Winners since 1975

 The 2016 and 2017 races took place at Chantilly while Longchamp was closed for redevelopment.

Earlier winners

 1957: Rose Royale
 1958: Lilya
 1959: Ginetta
 1960: Mincio
 1961: Belle Shika
 1962: Romulus
 1963: Hula Dancer
 1964: Mirna
 1965: Red Slipper
 1966: Silver Shark
 1967: Great Nephew
 1968: Pola Bella
 1969: Habitat
 1970: Gold Rod
 1971: Faraway Son
 1972: Sallust
 1973: Sparkler

See also
 List of French flat horse races

References

 France Galop / Racing Post:
 galop.courses-france.com:
 1957–1979, 1980–present

 france-galop.com – A Brief History: Prix du Moulin de Longchamp.
 galopp-sieger.de – Prix du Moulin de Longchamp.
 horseracingintfed.com – International Federation of Horseracing Authorities – Race Detail (2017).
 pedigreequery.com – Prix du Moulin de Longchamp – Longchamp.

Open mile category horse races
Longchamp Racecourse
Horse races in France
Recurring sporting events established in 1957
1957 establishments in France